Club Deportivo Calahorra "B" is a Spanish football club based in Calahorra, in the autonomous community of La Rioja. Founded in the 1970s, it is the reserve team of CD Calahorra, and currently plays in Tercera División RFEF – Group 16, holding home matches at Estadio La Planilla, with a capacity of 5,000 spectators.

History
Founded in 1965 as CD Calahorra Promesas, the club acted as a reserve team of CD Calahorra and played intermittently in the regional leagues until the club decided to close the reserve section in 1995. They returned to an active status in 1998, playing four seasons in the Regional Preferente before again folding.

In 2004, Calahorra reached an agreement with AF Calahorra to become their farm team, and in June 2011, the latter was fully integrated in the former's structure, being renamed to CD Calahorra B. In the following year, however, the club opted to use the Juvenil squad as their reserve team, and the B-team became inactive.

Calahorra B returned to action in 2018, and immediately achieved promotion to Tercera División in May of the following year.

Season to season

2 seasons in Tercera División
1 season in Tercera División RFEF

Notes

References

External links
 

Football clubs in La Rioja (Spain)
Association football clubs established in 1965
1965 establishments in Spain
Spanish reserve football teams
Football clubs in Spain